Cool for Cats was one of the first shows on British TV to feature music for a teenage audience. It was produced by Associated Rediffusion, part of the ITV network, and ran from December 1956 to February 1961. 

The show was presented by Kent Walton. It lasted 15 minutes. Discs were played and then commented upon. Sometimes The Dougie Squires Dancers, which included the then unknown Una Stubbs, performed dance routines to the music, and sometimes Tony Hart would draw a relevant cartoon while the record played. The programme was originally broadcast on Mondays at 7:15 pm and later moved to Thursdays. Owing to its success, it was a twice-weekly show (the second a repeat), later expanding to half an hour. The show's initiator was director Joan-Kemp Welch, the drama innovator, and the first—and the show's longest-running—choreographer was Dougie Squires.  

Kent Walton took the title from a show of the same name he hosted on Radio Luxembourg.

External links
The TV Rock n' Roll Years at Whirlygig TV
Music in Bradford 1956 at the Bradford time line
Something about Una Independent on Sunday, 22 February 2004

1956 British television series debuts
1961 British television series endings
1950s British music television series
1960s British music television series